Yashchenko or Yaschenko is a gender-neutral Ukrainian surname. Notable people with the surname include:

Serhiy Yashchenko (born 1959), Ukrainian football manager and former player
Vladimir Yashchenko (1959–1999), Ukrainian high jumper

See also
 

Ukrainian-language surnames